Detonation is a process of combustion in which a supersonic shock wave propagates through a body of material.

Detonation may also refer to:

 Engine knocking, a manifestation of improper combustion timing in internal combustion engines

Entertainment
Detonation,  Season 2  Episode 9  The Man in the High Castle (TV series)
 Detonation (band), a Dutch melodic death metal band
"Detonation", song by Trivium from The Crusade (album)  2006 
"Detonation", song by Steven Wilson from To the Bone (Steven Wilson album) 2017

See also
 
 
 Detonator (disambiguation)
 Detention (disambiguation)